Orlando is a township in the urban area of Soweto, South Africa. The township was founded in 1931 and named after Edwin Orlando Leake, Mayor of Johannesburg from 1925 to 1926. It is divided in two main areas: Orlando West and Orlando East.

History
The township of Orlando was directly involved in some of the most important events of the fight against the apartheid system. Some of the most dramatic clashes between the South African police and anti-apartheid demonstrators occurred in Orlando West. This includes the Soweto uprising where 12-year-old Hector Pieterson was killed. The Hector Pieterson Memorial Museum was established in Orlando West to commemorate those events. In the surroundings of the museum is the house where Nelson Mandela lived for several years while practicing law; the house now hosts the Mandela Family Museum. Opposite the Mandela house is the Mandela Family Restaurant. South African struggle champion  Mama Winnie Zanyiwe Nomzamo Madikizela-Mandela resided in Soweto during the apartheid era until her death on 2 April 2018.

Orlando Stadium is the home of the soccer team Orlando Pirates of the South African Premier Division. They have won nine total top-flight league titles (four in the modern Premier Division), and nine national cup championships.

Notes

Gallery

Soweto Townships
Johannesburg Region D